Membra Jesu nostri, BuxWV 75, is a cycle of seven cantatas composed in 1680 by Dieterich Buxtehude and dedicated to Gustaf Düben. More specifically and fully it is, in Buxtehude’s phrase, a “devotione decantata,” or “sung devotion,” titled Membra Jesu nostri patientis sanctissima, which translates from the Latin as Limbs Most Holy of Our Suffering Jesus. Regarding genre, the cycle consists in seven concerto-aria cantatas, a form that had emerged in Germany in the 1660s. The stanzas of its main text are drawn from the medieval hymn Salve mundi salutare, also known as the Rhythmica oratio, formerly ascribed to Bernard of Clairvaux but now thought to be by Arnulf of Leuven. Each cantata addresses a part of Jesus’ crucified body: feet, knees, hands, side, breast, heart and face; in each, Biblical words referring to the limb frame verses of the hymn’s text.

Structure 
Each cantata in Membra Jesu nostri is divided into six sections; an instrumental introduction; a concerto for instruments and five voices (SSATB), with the exception of the fifth and sixth cantatas where only three voices are used; three arias for one or three voices, each followed by an instrumental ritornello; and an exact reprise of the concerto. The first and the last cantata of the cycle deviate from this pattern. In the first cantata the choir repeats the first aria after the reprise, in the last one, Ad faciem, 5 parts sing the last aria, and then a final Amen instead of the reprise concludes the cycle.

The structure of Membra is dictated by its text. Buxtehude selected biblical verses for the concertos, and three strophes from each part of the poem Salve mundi salutare for the arias in each cantata. The biblical words are chosen for mentioning the member of the cantata and taken mostly from the Old Testament. The metre of the poetry unifies the arias' rhythmic patterns.

Example 1 (in bold are stressed syllables):

 I Ad pedes:
 Sal-ve mun-di sa-lu-ta-re

 II Ad genua:
 Quid sum ti-bi re-spon-su-rus

 III Ad manus: 
 In cru-o-re tu-o lo-tum

 V Ad pectus: 
 Pec-tus mi-hi con-fer mun-dum

Scoring 
Membra Jesu nostri is scored for five voices SSATB, two violins, consort of viols, and a basso continuo of double bass, theorbo and organ. The voices sing solos, duets, trios, and as a choir. The viols play in the sixth cantata only, with the middle two choir voices removed. In the table, S2 refers to the second soprano. For each "concerto" section, the Biblical text source is given; for the arias, it is always Salve mundi salutare.

Texts

I Ad pedes 
(To the feet)

II Ad genua 
(To the knees)

III Ad manus 
(To the hands)

IV Ad latus 
(To the sides)

V Ad pectus 
(To the breast)

VI Ad cor 
(To the heart)

In this part a consort of violas da gamba replaces the violins.

VII Ad faciem 
(To the face)

Recordings 
 Jan-Feb 1987 – Ton Koopman; Schlick sI, Frimmer sII, Chance a, Prégardien t, Kooy b; Hannover Knabenchor – Erato ECD 75378
 Sept 1988 – John Eliot Gardiner; Monteverdi Choir, English Baroque Soloists – Archiv 447 298-2
 March 4, 1994 – Diego Fasolis; Caterina Trogu soprano I, Roberta Invernizzi soprano II, Roberto Balconi alto, Mario Cecchetti tenor, Daniele Carnovich bass; Choir of Radio Svizzera Lugano, Sonatori della Gioiosa Marca, Accademia Strumentale Italiana Verona – Naxos 8.553787
 1997 – Masaaki Suzuki; Yoshie Hida, Midori Suzuki, Aki Yanagisawa and Yuko Anazawa sopranos, Yoshikazu Mera alto, Makoto Sakurada tenor, Yoshitaka Ogasawara bass; Bach Collegium Japan – BIS CD-871
 1999 – Erik van Nevel; Johannette Zomer soprano I, Anne-Marie Buyle soprano II, Vincent Darras alto, Jan Caals tenor, Conor Biggs bass; Capella Currende, Currende Consort – Eufoda CD 1294
 2000 – Harry Christophers; Carolyn Sampson soprano I, Libby Crabtree soprano II, Robin Blaze alto, James Gilchrist tenor, Simon Birchall bass; soloists serve as choir, The Sixteen – Chandos CKD 141
 2003 – René Jacobs; María Cristina Kiehr soprano I, Rosa Dominguez soprano II, Andreas Scholl alto, Gerd Türk tenor, Ulrich Messenthaler bass; soloists serve as choir, Concerto Vocale – Harmonia Mundi; this recording served as the soundtrack of a later DVD
 2005 – Konrad Junghänel; Cantus Cölln – Harmonia Mundi HMC 901912
 2005 – Jos van Veldhoven; Anne Grimm soprano I, Johannette Zomer soprano II, Peter de Groot alto, Andrew Tortise tenor, Bas Ramselaar bass; soloists serve as choir, Netherlands Bach Society – Channel Classics CCS SA 24006
 Dec 3-5, 2009 – no conductor; Kirkby et al; Purcell Quartet, Fretwork – Chaconne CHAN 0775
 Nov 10-12, 2010 – Sigiswald Kuijken; La Petite Bande – Accent ACC 24243
 2014 – Daniel Hyde; Robin Blaze alto, John Mark Ainsley tenor, Giles Underwood bass; Choir of Magdalen College, Oxford, viol consort Phantasm – Opus Arte OACD 9023-D
 2018 – Philippe Pierlot; Hanna Bayodi soprano I, Maria Keohane soprano II, Carlos Mena alto, Jeffrey Thompson tenor, Matthias Vieweg bass; Ricercar Consort – Mirare MIR 444
 March 10-15, 2021 – Tymen Jan Bronda; Witmer sI, Caihuela sII, Kullmann a, Knight t, Baker b;  – Brilliant Classics

References

External links 
 
 Free sheet music of all choral parts at the Choral Public Domain Library
 Free score at IMSLP
 Scanned images of original manuscript in the Düben Collection, Uppsala University
 Salve Mundi Salutare – Article in the Catholic Encyclopedia
 Buxtehude: 'Membra Jesu Nostri' YouTube channel sample recordings
 Oratio rhythmica text after the  Patrologia Latina at Bibliotheca Augustana

1680 compositions
Church cantatas
Compositions by Dieterich Buxtehude
Music based on the Crucifixion of Jesus